Wood's Monument is an obelisk monument in honor of Colonel Eleazer Derby Wood (1783–1814), an engineer officer and early graduate of West Point who died during the War of 1812 at the Siege of Fort Erie on 17 September 1814.  Old prints of West Point show this monument located on a knoll near the flag pole. The monument was once used as a navigational aid for ships making the passage down the Hudson River.

Eleazer Wood
Eleazer D. Wood (1783 – September 17, 1814) was born in Lunenburg, Massachusetts.  Wood was one of the earliest graduates of the U.S. Military Academy, becoming the 17th graduate of the academy in 1806. He was well known among the army officer corps as an engineer and artillery officer.  He built Fort Meigs in Ohio as well as other fortifications. Fort Wood, an early 19th-century star-shaped fortification on Bedloe's Island (named after Isaac Bedloo), now called Liberty Island, was named in his honor,  as is Wood County, Ohio.

History of the monument
At the conclusion of the War of 1812, Major General Jacob Brown contacted Colonel Sylvanus Thayer, Superintendent of the Military Academy, and ordered the monument's construction at West Point at his own expense. Erected in 1818, it was once prominently located near the site of present-day Trophy Point. As the academy expanded, the monument was moved to the cemetery in 1885, where it is located next to the graves of the Warner sisters, Susan and Anna. Its dedication in 1818 makes it the oldest monument at the academy.

References

Monuments and memorials at West Point
1818 sculptures
Stone sculptures in New York (state)
1818 establishments in New York (state)